The War Between The Classes is a novel written by Gloria D. Miklowitz.

The novel explores how society can overcome the stereotypes taught by media through its teen-aged protagonist. The book focuses on the main character, Amy, as she struggles to keep a good relationship with her boyfriend throughout the story due to the disapproval of their parents. It also focuses on the color armband game, and Amy's feelings as she goes against all the laws of the game.

The novel was adapted into a television special, as part of the CBS Schoolbreak Special series.

Summary
The story begins with Amy and Adam making their way to the school luau after leaving Amy's house, where the story introduces its themes of racism and prejudice. Later, Amy's high-school class plays a game created by their teacher, Mr. Otero. In the game, there ar classes which are represented by armbands: Blues – highest, richest; Dark Greens – upper-middle class, semi-rich; Light Greens – lower-middle class, semi-poor; Oranges – lowest class, very poor. To further split up the classes, there is the superior sex, Teks(females), and the inferior sex, No-Teks(males). There are also groups of Color Game “policemen" (known as G4's in the color game), which are older students who played the game in previous years. They record the students’ activities, and make note of any good or bad behavior, which can result in demotions or promotions. The Color Game runs like this: Lower classes, or No-Teks, must bow when they meet eyes with a higher class, or Tek. Higher classes can give orders to lower classes. Lower classes may not speak to a higher class unless spoken to, and can only reply in a short answer. You must have your armband and journal with you at all times. The main character in this book is Emiko “Amy” Sumoto. She comes from a Japanese family, and her parents believe she should keep the family tradition going by marrying a Japanese boy. Instead, she is interested in a rich, White youth named Adam. In the Color Game, all the minorities in the class turn out to be high colors, and rich whites end up as lower colors, which is all planned out by their teacher. Although Amy is used to being treated as a lower person in real life, along with the Latinos, she doesn't feel right with the power she has. However, being one of the most powerful people in the class, she decides to try and unite all the colors to an equal rank. She puts up “All Colors Unite” posters all over the school, causing her to be demoted from Blue to Orange along with Juan, who helped her attach the advertisements. Afterward, the oranges make four-colored armbands for all students to wear. Finally she succeeds in doing this, and unites the whole class as one. The Color Game was arranged to show real-life racial, sex, and economic differences between people.

Themes
This book explores many themes related to society today. Some of these themes include Family, Racism, Prejudice, Respect, and Discrimination.

Family– Although Amy and Adam's families have similar prejudices against other races, their families differ greatly in the values they hold, the way they show respect for authority, and the amount of time the parents spend with their children.

Racism– Racism is evident in Adam and Amy's parents, but neither of them holds their parents’ views. Adam says to Amy, “Parents! Sometimes I wonder how either of us could have escaped all their prejudices.” (p. 16) On the other hand, Juan's mother did not show racism, but Juan did.

Prejudice– As a result of Mr. Otero's Color Game, students are forced to look at ways they prejudge others. Sometimes in high schools this prejudging does not result in racism, but results in other social cliques based on criteria such as clothing, athletic participation, cheer leading, and grades.

Respect– Amy and Adam disagree over the way to handle Amy's father and his strictness with Amy.

Discrimination– Most of the characters in the novel are discriminated against in one way or the other, yet each of them show discrimination to others. How could you apply the Golden Rule, “Do unto others as you would have them do unto you,” to this situation?

Subplot
The intense 
subplot of Hideo and Sue shows that such a relationship like that of Amy and Adam can exist for a long period of time. It may be an outlook of their future life. Moreover, it demonstrates that "whites" are not naturally prejudiced. It also illustrates how old-fashioned the idea is that women should do housework and men should go to work. Instead of this, Sue and Hideo see each other equal, so both are going to work and share the housework between each other. Hideo usually does the chores requiring more physical strength for and Sue does the remaining work. It is in fact a very idealistic view of people, always being fair and unbiased towards others in trying to understand and help them. There are also many other subplots in the story such as Adam and his mother, and Amy and her father.

References

Novels by Gloria D. Miklowitz
1985 American novels
Psychological novels
Novels about racism
Armbands
English-language novels